Camilo Bryan Rodríguez Pedraza (born 4 March 1995) is a Chilean footballer that currently plays for Primera División club Deportes Antofagasta as a right back.

Honours

Club
Colo-Colo
 Torneo Clausura (1): 2014

References

External links
 
 Rodríguez at Football-Lineups

1995 births
Living people
Footballers from Santiago
Chilean footballers
Chile under-20 international footballers
Association football defenders
Colo-Colo B footballers
Colo-Colo footballers
Everton de Viña del Mar footballers
C.D. Antofagasta footballers
Segunda División Profesional de Chile players
Chilean Primera División players
2015 South American Youth Football Championship players